A number of ships of the Spanish Navy have borne the name San José in honour of Saint Joseph
 San José, a ship carrying the silver treasure of Real Situado to Valdivia that wrecked in 1651 in the lands of the Cunco people.  
  (1698), a 60-gun galleon of the Armada de la Guardia de la Carrera de las Indias destroyed on 8 June 1708 (New Style) during Wager's Action off Cartagena de Indias, Colombia in the War of Spanish Succession
 , a New England-built 326-ton ship in the Spanish Treasure Fleet, sunk in a hurricane off the coast of Florida in 1733
 , a 70-gun ship of the line built at Havana and wrecked (without casualties) at Brest in April 1780
 , a polacca.
 , a 112-gun ship of the line built at Ferrol, Spain, captured by the United Kingdom at the Battle of Cape St Vincent on 14 February 1797 and renamed 

Spanish Navy ship names